Raka is a village in Dênggar Township in Saga County in the Shigatse Prefecture of the Tibet Autonomous Region of China. Historically it lay in the province of Tsang. Raka is very well connected, connected by provincial highway 206 to Coqen in the north, Saga in the southwest and Lhatse, Shigatse and Lhasa to the east. Several kilometres to the east is the village of Kyêrdo. An "enormous tributary" called the Raka Tsanpo flows nearby and the saline lake of Raka Lake is also located in the vicinity.

See also
List of towns and villages in Tibet

References

Populated places in Shigatse
Saga County
Villages in China